Robin Reed may refer to:

Robin Reed, wrestler
Robin Reed (meteorologist)

See also
Robin Reid (disambiguation)